Piney Township is a township in Clarion County, Pennsylvania, United States. The population was 398 at the 2020 census, a decrease from the figure of 453 tabulated in 2010.

Geography
Piney Township is located just southwest of the center of Clarion County and is bordered to the north by the Clarion River and to the southwest by the borough of Sligo. Piney Creek flows across the northern corner of the township, into the Clarion River at the settlement of Piney.

Demographics

As of the census of 2000, there were 516 people, 142 households, and 112 families residing in the township.  The population density was 29.0 people per square mile (11.2/km2).  There were 162 housing units at an average density of 9.1/sq mi (3.5/km2).  The racial makeup of the township was 97.87% White, 1.16% Asian, 0.39% from other races, and 0.58% from two or more races. Hispanic or Latino of any race were 0.39% of the population.

There were 142 households, out of which 32.4% had children under the age of 18 living with them, 64.8% were married couples living together, 7.7% had a female householder with no husband present, and 21.1% were non-families. 18.3% of all households were made up of individuals, and 12.0% had someone living alone who was 65 years of age or older.  The average household size was 2.73 and the average family size was 3.04.

In the township the population was spread out, with 20.2% under the age of 18, 3.7% from 18 to 24, 22.9% from 25 to 44, 15.9% from 45 to 64, and 37.4% who were 65 years of age or older.  The median age was 48 years. For every 100 females there were 74.3 males.  For every 100 females age 18 and over, there were 68.9 males.

The median income for a household in the township was $31,375, and the median income for a family was $34,167. Males had a median income of $28,542 versus $18,500 for females. The per capita income for the township was $16,473.  About 10.8% of families and 14.3% of the population were below the poverty line, including 22.8% of those under age 18 and 3.8% of those age 65 or over.

References

External links
Piney Township listing at Clarion County Association of Township Officials

Populated places established in 1798
Townships in Clarion County, Pennsylvania